Milcho Goranov (6 November 1928 – 28 July 2008) was a Bulgarian footballer who played as a defender, most notably for Slavia Sofia. Goranov also earned 21 caps for Bulgaria. He competed in the men's tournament at the 1956 Summer Olympics.

Honours

Club
Slavia Sofia
Bulgarian Cup: 1952

International
Bulgaria
Olympic Bronze Medal: 1956

References

External links

1928 births
2008 deaths
Bulgarian footballers
Bulgaria international footballers
PFC Slavia Sofia players
First Professional Football League (Bulgaria) players
Olympic footballers of Bulgaria
Footballers at the 1956 Summer Olympics
Olympic bronze medalists for Bulgaria
Olympic medalists in football
Medalists at the 1956 Summer Olympics
Association football defenders
People from Montana Province